Park Bo-kyung is a South Korean actress. She is known for her roles in dramas such as Now, We Are Breaking Up, Beyond Evil, Link: Eat, Love, Kill, and Little Women. She also appeared in movies Hello, Schoolgirl, Mr. XXX-Kisser and The Gangster, the Cop, the Devil.

Personal life 
Park Bo-kyung married actor Jin Seon-kyu in 2011 and has two children, a son and a daughter.

Filmography

Television series

Film

References

External Links 
 
 

1981 births
Living people
21st-century South Korean actresses
South Korean television actresses
South Korean film actresses